Rebecca Anne Johnston (born September 24, 1989) is a Canadian ice hockey player for the Calgary section of the PWHPA and, since 2007, the Canadian national team. She played four seasons at Cornell University and was selected second overall in the 2012 CWHL Draft by the Calgary Inferno. As of 2022, she has three Winter Olympic gold medals, one silver, and two world championship titles.

Playing career

Canada Winter Games
Johnston (and future Cornell teammate Catherine White) represented Ontario at the 2007 Canada Winter Games. In the gold medal match versus Manitoba, Johnston and White each had one goal and two assists, as Ontario won by a score of 6–3 and finished the tournament undefeated. In a game versus Newfoundland at the Canada Winter Games (March 5, 2007), Johnston was on a line with Mallory Deluce and Jenn Wakefield. The three combined for 12 points in a 19–0 victory.

Cornell University
Johnston was Cornell's first player to be named first-team ECAC Hockey and receive rookie of the year honours. She was also named first-team All-Ivy and Ivy League Rookie of the Year. In the 2008–09 season, Johnston's 37-point total (by mid-February) was the most points in a season for Cornell since the 1991–92 campaign (Kim Ratushny with 21 goals and 17 assists). Johnston's 37-point total in mid-February led the entire ECAC league in overall points. She was also second in the league and sixth in the NCAA in points per game with 1.85. She was selected for membership in the Quill and Dagger society.

Hockey Canada
Johnston won two gold medals with the National Women's Under-22 Team at the Air Canada Cup. Rebecca made her debut at the 2008 IIHF World Women's Championship, playing in all five games as Canada won silver. Rebecca Johnston was a member of Canada's Under-22 Team. The U-22 participated in the MLP Cup, held in Ravensburg, Germany, from Jan. 2–6, 2009. Johnston was part of the silver medal-winning team. In the tournament, Johnston accumulated seven points (3 goals, 4 assists). Her best game was in an 11–0 victory over Russia. Johnston scored a hat trick and added an assist. In addition to the MLP Cup, Johnston played with the Canadian Senior Team in the Four Nations Cup between November 4 and 9, 2009. Johnston was part of the silver medal-winning team. In the gold medal game of the 2010 Four Nations Cup, Rebecca Johnston's second goal of the game clinched the gold medal for Canada. Said goal came on a power play 6:21 into overtime. The goal gave Canada a 3–2 win over the United States. It was Hockey Canada's 12th championship in the tournament's 15-year history. She would lead all Canadian scorers in the tournament with four goals. In a game versus Russia at the 2012 IIHF Women's World Championship, Johnston registered a five-point game (one goal, four assists) in a 14–1 victory. In December 2013, Johnston was named to 2014 Olympic roster for Canada.

On January 11, 2022, Johnston was named to Canada's 2022 Olympic team for the Beijing Winter Olympics, where she won her third Olympic gold medal.

CWHL
In her first season with the Calgary Inferno, Johnston broke Danny Stone's franchise record for most points scored in one season. In addition, she clinched the Angela James Bowl, awarded to the league's scoring leader.

Johnston helped the Calgary Inferno capture their first-ever Clarkson Cup championship in 2016. Contested at Ottawa's Canadian Tire Centre, she scored twice in an 8–3 victory over Les Canadiennes de Montreal.

Career statistics

Regular season and playoffs

International

Awards and honours

NCAA
2008 ECAC Women's Hockey Preseason All-League team
First Team All-Ivy League, 2007–08, Forward
Ivy League Rookie of the Year 2007–08, Unanimous selection
First-team ECAC Hockey (2008)
ECAC rookie of the year honour (2008)
 2009 First Team All-ECAC
ECAC Player of the Week (Week of January 11, 2011)
ECAC Player of the Week (Week of March 1, 2011)
2011 Patty Kazmaier Award Nominee
2010–11 All-ECAC First Team
2011 Second Team All-America selection
2010–11 First Team All-Ivy
ECAC Player of the Year (2011–12)
ECAC First Team All-Star (2011–12)
2012 winner, Cornell women's hockey Bob Brunet '41 Most Valuable Player

CWHL
2015 Angela James Bowl winner
Most Valuable Player, 1st Canadian Women's Hockey League All-Star Game

References

External links
 
 
 
 
 

1989 births
Living people
Canadian expatriate ice hockey players in the United States
Calgary Inferno players
Canadian women's ice hockey forwards
Clarkson Cup champions
Cornell Big Red women's ice hockey players
Edmonton Chimos players
Ice hockey people from Ontario
Ice hockey players at the 2010 Winter Olympics
Ice hockey players at the 2014 Winter Olympics
Ice hockey players at the 2018 Winter Olympics
Ice hockey players at the 2022 Winter Olympics
Medalists at the 2010 Winter Olympics
Medalists at the 2014 Winter Olympics
Medalists at the 2018 Winter Olympics
Medalists at the 2022 Winter Olympics
Olympic gold medalists for Canada
Olympic silver medalists for Canada
Olympic ice hockey players of Canada
Olympic medalists in ice hockey
Sportspeople from Greater Sudbury
Toronto Furies players
Professional Women's Hockey Players Association players